"Did I Tell You" is the fourth single released by The Spinto Band, as well as the fourth single from the album Nice and Nicely Done.

"Did I Tell You" was the first single by The Spinto Band to be on the charts, reaching #55 in the UK.

2005 singles
2005 songs
The Spinto Band songs